A domestic long-haired cat is a cat of mixed ancestry – thus not belonging to any particular recognised cat breed – possessing a coat of semi-long to long fur. Domestic long-haired cats should not be confused with the British Longhair, American Longhair, or other breeds with "Longhair" names, which are standardized breeds defined by various registries. Other generic terms are long-haired house cat and, in British English, long-haired moggie. Domestic long-haired cats are the third most common type of cat in the USA.

In the cat fancy, and among veterinarians and animal control agencies, domestic long-haired cats may be classified with organisation-specific terminology (often capitalized), such as Domestic Longhair (DLH), House Cat, Longhair (HCL), or Semi-Longhair Household Pet. Such a pseudo-breed is used for registry and shelter/rescue classification purposes, and breeds such as the Persian cat. While not bred as show cats, some mixed-breed cats are actually pedigreed and entered into cat shows that have non-purebred "Household Pet" divisions.  Show rules vary; Fédération Internationale Féline (FIFe) permits "any eye colour, all coat colours and patterns, any coat length or texture, and any length of tail" (basically any healthy cat). Others may be more restrictive; an example from the World Cat Federation: "The colours chocolate and cinnamon, as well as their dilution (lilac and fawn) are not recognized in any combinations...[and] the pointed pattern is also not recognized".

Domestic long-haireds come in all genetically possible cat colours including tabby, tortoiseshell, bi-coloured, and smoke. Domestic long-haireds can have fur that is up to six inches long. They can also have a mane similar to a Maine Coon's, as well as toe tufts and ear tufts. Some long-haired cats are not able to maintain their own coat, which must be frequently groomed by a human or may be prone to matting. Because of their wide gene pool, domestic long-haireds are not predisposed to any genetically inherited problems.

History
Having apparently originated in Western Asia, Domestic long-haired cats have been kept as pets around the world for several centuries. During the 16th century the first long-haired cats were imported into Europe. In the mid-17th century, as the plague destroyed much of London's human population, the numbers of cats started to recover after centuries of persecution, as they were encouraged as protectors from flea-carrying rats.

How they developed in the first place is still a matter of speculation. The long coat may have been the result of a recessive mutant gene. When a long-haired cat is mated to one with a short coat, only short-haired kittens can result; however, their offspring, when mated, can produce a proportion of long-coated kittens. Successive litters of early European long-haired cats produced more and more long-coated offspring, which were more likely to survive in the cooler European climates. By the year 1521, around the time they were first documented in Italy, the variety had become fixed after only a few generations.

In the late 18th century, Peter Simon Pallas had advanced the hypothesis that the manul (also known as Pallas's cat) might be the ancestor of the long-haired domestic cat. He had anecdotal evidence that established even though the male offspring would be sterile hybrids, the female offspring could again reproduce with domestic cats and pass on a small proportion of the manul's genes. In 1907, zoologist Reginald Innes Pocock refuted this claim, citing his work on the skull differences between the manul and the Angoras or Persians of his time. This early hypothesis overlooked the potential for crossbreeding within the family Felidae. For example, the Savannah cat is a crossbreed between a domestic short-haired cat and a wild serval—both of which have different skulls and evolutionary lineage. Furthermore, hybrid females in the related genus Panthera, such as ligers and tigons, have successfully mated, producing tiligers and litigons.

The first modern, formal breeds of long-haired cats were the Persian and the Angora (named after Ankara, Turkey) and were said to have come from those two areas.

See also
 Domestic cat
 Domestic short-haired cat
 Landrace

References

Cat landraces